Gary Tapp (born December 29, 1953) is an American politician who served in the Kentucky House of Representatives from the 58th district from 1999 to 2003 and in the Kentucky Senate from the 20th district from 2003 to 2011.

References

1953 births
Living people
Republican Party members of the Kentucky House of Representatives
Republican Party Kentucky state senators